Prince Carlos or Carlo may refer to:

Charles, Prince of Viana (1421–1461)
Carlos, Prince of Asturias (1545–1568)
Carlo Gesualdo (1566–1613)
Charles Emmanuel III of Sardinia (1701–1773)
Prince Charles Alexander of Lorraine (1712–1780)
Infante Charles of Portugal (1716–1730)
Charles III of Spain (1716–1788)
Charles IV of Spain (1748–1819)
Charles Felix of Sardinia (1765–1831)
Charles Emmanuel, Prince of Carignan (1770–1800)
Carlo, Duke of Calabria (1775–1778)
Carlo Filangieri (1784–1867)
Carlo Emmanuele dal Pozzo, Prince della Cisterna (1787–1864)
Infante Carlos, Count of Molina (1788–1855)
Charles Albert of Sardinia (1798–1849)
Charles Lucien Bonaparte (1803–1857)
Charles Ferdinand, Prince of Capua (1811–1862)
Charles III, Duke of Parma (1823–1854)
Carlos I of Portugal (1863–1908)
Prince Carlos of Bourbon-Two Sicilies (1870–1949)
Carlos Hugo, Duke of Parma (1930–2010)
Infante Carlos, Duke of Calabria (1938–2015)
Carlo Alessandro, 3rd Duke of Castel Duino (born 1952)
Prince Carlo, Duke of Castro (born 1963)
Carlos, Duke of Parma (born 1970)

See also
Prince Charles (disambiguation)
Prince Karl (disambiguation)